{{chembox
| Verifiedfields = changed
| verifiedrevid = 477166938
| ImageFile=EDDHA.png
| ImageSize=200px
| IUPACName=2-[2-[[2-Hydroxy-1-(2-hydroxyphenyl)-2-oxoethyl]amino]ethylamino]-2-(2-hydroxyphenyl)acetic acid
| OtherNames=Ethylenediamine-N,N-bis(2-hydroxyphenylacetic acid
|Section1=
|Section2=
|Section3=
}}EDDHA or ethylenediamine-N,N′''-bis(2-hydroxyphenylacetic acid)''' is a chelating agent.  Like EDTA, it binds metal ions as a hexadentate ligand, using two amines, two phenolate centers, and two carboxylates as the six binding sites.  The complexes are typically anionic.  The ligand itself is a white, water soluble powder.  Both the free ligand and its tetraanionic chelating agent are abbreviated EDDHA.  In contrast to EDDHA, most related aminopolycarboxylic acid chelating agents feature tertiary amines and few have phenolate groups.

Preparation
It is produced by the multicomponent reaction of phenol, glyoxalic acid, and ethylenediamine.  In this process, the initial Schiff base condensate alkylates the phenol.  Related ligands can be prepared more efficiently using para-cresol.

Uses
It is used to mobilize metal ions analogously to the use of EDTA.

EDDHA has been used in phytoextraction of lead from contaminated soils. It degrades with release of salicylic acid.

References

Chelating agents
Dicarboxylic acids
Phenols